These are the albums that reached number-one on the Billboard R&B Albums chart during the 1960s. The chart debuted in the issue dated January 30, 1965.

Chart history

See also
1960s in music
List of Billboard number-one rhythm and blues hits

1960s
United States RandB albums